Neil Andrew Ramírez (born May 25, 1989) is an American former professional baseball pitcher. He has previously played in Major League Baseball (MLB) for the Chicago Cubs, Milwaukee Brewers, Minnesota Twins, San Francisco Giants, New York Mets, Cleveland Indians, and Toronto Blue Jays.

Early life and amateur career
Ramírez attended and played baseball at Kempsville High School in Virginia Beach, Virginia. In high school, he was named the 2007 Gatorade Virginia Baseball Player of the Year, made the East team roster at the 2006 Aflac All-American Classic and won a silver medal with the United States at the 2006 World Junior Baseball Championship in Cuba. Baseball America ranked him the 71st best draft prospect in 2007.

Ramírez originally committed to play college baseball at Georgia Tech but was selected by the Texas Rangers in the first round of the 2007 Major League Baseball Draft and decided instead to sign a professional contract.

Professional career

Texas Rangers
Ramírez spent six years in the Rangers' farm system, playing for the Spokane Indians in 2008 and the Hickory Crawdads in 2009 and 2010.

On August 17,  he was promoted to Triple-A at Round Rock in place of Eric Hurley who was placed on the disabled list with viral infection. Prior to his promotion, on July 15, Ramírez was sent to rehab in Double-A Frisco, Texas due to a sore shoulder.  He was quoted as saying to MLB.com that the absence had not bothered him.

On November 18, 2011, Ramírez was added to the Rangers' 40-man roster.

Chicago Cubs

On August 23, 2013, Ramírez was traded to the Chicago Cubs as the player to be named later in the July 2013 trade of Matt Garza. By June 9, 2014, through 14 innings pitched, he had struck out 23 players while having only .71 walks plus hits per inning pitched rating.

On June 5, 2014, Ramírez earned his first career save in a victory over the New York Mets.

Ramírez finished the year with a 1.44 ERA in 43.2 innings pitched

Milwaukee Brewers
On May 31, 2016, Ramírez was claimed off waivers by the Milwaukee Brewers.

Minnesota Twins
On June 12, 2016, Ramírez was claimed off waivers by the Minnesota Twins. He finished the year with a 6.00 ERA in 24 innings

San Francisco Giants
During the 2016 offseason, Ramírez signed a minor league contract with the San Francisco Giants. He was designated for assignment on April 30, 2017, to create room for Bryan Morris who had his contract purchased from Triple-A.

Toronto Blue Jays
On May 4, 2017, Ramírez was claimed off waivers by the Toronto Blue Jays. He was designated for assignment on May 9 without having thrown a pitch for the Blue Jays. On May 14, Ramírez elected free agency after being outrighted to the minor leagues.

New York Mets
On May 16, 2017, the New York Mets signed Ramírez. On July 20, the Mets designated Ramírez for assignment.

Washington Nationals
On July 27, 2017, Ramírez signed a minor league deal with the Washington Nationals. He elected free agency on November 6, 2017.

Cleveland Indians

Ramírez signed a minor league contract with the Cleveland Indians on November 30, 2017. The Indians purchased Ramírez's contract on May 15, 2018. He finished the season with an ERA of 4.54 in  innings, his most output since his rookie season in 2014.

He began the 2019 season in the bullpen. He was designated for assignment by the Indians on May 18, 2019 after registering an ERA of 5.40 in  innings. After clearing waivers, Ramírez accepted a minor league assignment to the Columbus Clippers, the Indians' Triple-A affiliate, on May 23, 2019. He was released on August 2, 2019.

Second stint with Blue Jays
On August 6, 2019, Ramírez signed a minor league deal with the Toronto Blue Jays. He was called up by the Blue Jays on August 11. On September 1, Ramirez was designated for assignment. He declared free agency on September 4, 2019.

Los Angeles Angels
On December 22, 2019, Ramírez signed a minor league deal with the Los Angeles Angels that included an invitation to Spring Training. Ramirez was released by the Angels organization on September 1, 2020.

Scouting report

Personal
Ramírez married Tiffany in October 2014.

References

External links

1989 births
Living people
Sportspeople from Virginia Beach, Virginia
Baseball players from Virginia
Major League Baseball pitchers
Chicago Cubs players
Milwaukee Brewers players
Minnesota Twins players
San Francisco Giants players
New York Mets players
Cleveland Indians players
Toronto Blue Jays players
Spokane Indians players
Hickory Crawdads players
Myrtle Beach Pelicans players
Frisco RoughRiders players
Surprise Saguaros players
Arizona League Cubs players
Round Rock Express players
Tennessee Smokies players
Iowa Cubs players
Rochester Red Wings players
Syracuse Chiefs players
Columbus Clippers players
Buffalo Bisons (minor league) players
Dunedin Blue Jays players